Beechwood School is a co-educational independent day and boarding school for children aged 3 – 18, which comprises a Nursery, Preparatory School and Senior School, with boarding for children aged 11 – 18. 
Beechwood is situated on a 23-acre campus in Tunbridge Wells, Kent. 
Admission to the Senior School is via assessment in mathematics, English, non-verbal reasoning, and creative writing. Ages of admission are at 11+, 13+ and 16+.  The School serves the local area in West Kent and East Sussex, but welcomes boarders from many different nations.

History
The origins of Beechwood House date back to 1855, located on Calverley Mile Road (now Pembury Road) amid a number of other Italian style Victorian villas of the time. The School celebrated its centenary in 2015. This was marked by alumni events and the collation of artifacts for a time capsule to be opened in 2065. Founded by the Society of the Sacred Heart in 1915, Beechwood retains its founders' traditions but today welcomes pupils of all faiths. 
Beechwood's Headmaster is Mr Justin Foster-Gandey.

Notable former pupils

 Fatima Akilu, Nigerian psychologist and author
 Deirdre Clancy, costume designer
 Julia Cumberlege, Baroness Cumberlege (nee Camm), politician
 Miatta Fahnbulleh, economist
 Pauline Gower, aviator
 Louise Mensch, author and former MP
 Libby Purves, journalist

References

External links
 Profile on the Independent Schools Council website

Schools in Royal Tunbridge Wells
Private schools in Kent
Educational institutions established in 1915
1915 establishments in England